Drop Mania is a falling-block puzzle video game, developed by Ninai Games (as Detonium Interactive) and published by Suomen Kotijäätelö Oy in 1999 for Windows. It was sold in Finnish ice cream vans.

Gameplay
In a similar fashion to Tetris, coloured blocks drop from the top of the screen and collect at the bottom. The aim is to arrange groups of colours and then make contact with an explosion block. This destroys all the same-colour blocks in one group, larger groups earning more points. More points are also earned for combos (where multiple groups explode at the same time) and chains (where blocks falling as the result of an explosion cause further explosions.)

This same gameplay would be implemented in the 2001 game, Rampage Puzzle Attack.

Legacy
The sequel, Super Drop Mania was also developed by Ninai, and published by Fathammer in 2005. It is designed for portable devices, being released for Symbian OS and Windows Mobile. It met with good critical reaction, reviewers highlighting the floating game-play area, rounded graphics and entertaining gameplay. One review criticising the lack of a "one more go" feeling found in other Tetris variants, whilst another felt that it was even more addictive.

References

External links
http://www.ninai.com/ – official site

Falling block puzzle games
1999 video games
Windows games
Windows-only games
Finland-exclusive video games
Video games developed in Finland
Video games scored by Jonne Valtonen
Multiplayer and single-player video games